Peter John Lowe (7 January 1935 – 4 August 1988) was an English cricketer. Lowe was a right-handed batsman who fielded as a wicket-keeper. He was born at Sutton Coldfield, Warwickshire.

Lowe made a single first-class appearance for Warwickshire against Oxford University at Edgbaston in 1964. He was not required to bat in this match, while behind the stumps he took 2 catches. These was his only major appearance for Warwickshire.

He died at Avon Gorge, Bristol on 4 August 1988.

References

External links
Peter Lowe at ESPNcricinfo
Peter Lowe at CricketArchive

1935 births
1988 suicides
Cricketers from Sutton Coldfield
English cricketers
Warwickshire cricketers
Suicides by jumping in England
Wicket-keepers